Omar Cook (born March 24, 1992) is an American actor, film director, and former American football defensive back. He played college football at Southern University in Baton Rouge, Louisiana, graduating in 2013 with a Bachelor of Arts degree in Mass Communication. He is best known for his role in the film God of Dreams (2022). He is also known for his work as motion capture actor with the Madden NFL video game series.

College career
Cook played for the Southern Jaguars from 2010 to 2013. He redshirted his first year and earned a starting spot in his senior season.  After three coaching changes, Cook emerged as a senior for Southern earning a scholarship and started all 13 games to include the Southwestern Athletic Conference (SWAC) Championship.  He recorded 77 total tackles (Ranked #1 on the team for defensive backs), tallied 45 solo tackles (tied for #2 on team), 1.5 tackles for loss, had 3 interceptions (Tied for #1 on team), 6 passes defensed, forced 1 fumble and recovered 2 fumbles.  Notably, his final interception came at a crucial period of the nationally televised (ESPN) SWAC Championship game against Jackson State University.  Cook was selected to the 2014 FCS National Bowl All-Star game as a starting defensive back where he tallied 2 tackles, a pass breakup and a key red zone interception.

Professional career

Nebraska Danger
Cook signed with the Nebraska Danger of the Indoor Football League (IFL) on October 10, 2014.

Billings Wolves
Cook was signed by the Billings Wolves on February 16, 2015.  While a member of the Wolves in 2015, Cook finished the season 2nd on the team in tackles with 71 (46 solo), 2.5 tackles for loss, 1 interception and 8 pass breakups. In his final game of the 2015 season, Cook tallied 12 total tackles against the Nebraska Danger. Cook re-signed with the Wolves for 2016 and had 20 tackles. Cook's 2016 season was abbreviated due to being released from his contract to pursue other football related ventures on April 11, 2016 as he was selected to perform as a Motion Capture Actor for EA Sports and the Madden Video Game franchise.

Nebraska Danger
On October 28, 2016, Cook signed with the Nebraska Danger for the 2017 season. During the season Cook tallied 42 tackles (2 tackles for loss), 4 pass break-ups and 1 interception.

San Diego Strike Force 
On March 22, 2019 Cook signs 1-Year deal with the  San Diego Strike Force of the Indoor Football League. Was named Team Captain for the 2019 season. Omar finished a stellar regular season in the Top 10 in the entire IFL in tackles, 2nd in pass break-ups and 1st on the team in tackles with a career-high of 73, 1st in pass break-ups with 12 and tied for 1st in interceptions.

Acting career
Omar Cook is a 21x award winning actor and filmmaker born in Riverside, California. From an early age, Omar thrived in sports eventually going on to play collegiate football at Southern University. His collegiate career landed him an opportunity to play professional football where he played 4 seasons in the Indoor Football League. Omar began his journey into entertainment doing stunts as a motion capture actor with the Madden Video Game Series earning credits in Madden ’18, ’19, ’20, ’21, ’22, & ’23. This led to further opportunities doing sports stunts in Hollywood for shows such as Ballers for HBO and All American on The CW, and Colin in Black & White on Netflix. He is most known for his work on The CW series All American for his role as “Troy”, a South Crenshaw high school football player as well as doing football stunt work and doubling for the characters “Jabari Long” and “Cameron” appearing in 21 episodes over 3 seasons.

Omar has built a successful career in entertainment working on multiple movies, short films, major network TV shows, and video games including supporting roles in feature films The 4 Points, Fortunate Son, God of Dreams, Lost in the Moment, and Expunged. He directed three multi award winning films including Coke Boys, SKANDALOUZ and Deadly Thoughts which collectively racked up 21 awards including multiple debut filmmaker awards, Best Actor, Best short film awards and more.

Filmography

Film

Television

Video Games

Awards and Nominations

References

External links

https://www.dangerfootball.com/team/players.php?id=242
http://goifl.com/sports/fball/2016-17/players/omarcook5a4q
http://www.goifl.com/sports/fball/2014-15/teams/billingswolves?view=lineup
https://www.imdb.com/name/nm11557204/?ref_=nmmi_mi_nm
https://www.247liveculture.com/entertainment-news1/omar-cook-makes-his-directorial-debut-in-award-winning-short-film-skandalouz

Living people
1992 births
American football defensive backs
African-American players of American football
Southern Jaguars football players
Nebraska Danger players
Billings Wolves players
Players of American football from Riverside, California
Sportspeople from Irvine, California
21st-century African-American sportspeople
21st-century American male actors
African-American male actors
American male film actors